Don’t Want to Miss a Thing  is the 24th novel by British author Jill Mansell.

Background
Jill Mansell first had the idea for becoming a novelist after reading an article in a magazine about women who had changed their lives by becoming best-selling authors. Eventually she decided to write the kind of book "I would love to read". The end result was her first novel, Fast Friends.

Plot summary 
This romantic comedy from author Jill Mansell explores the impact of grief and unexpected parenthood.

Characters in Don't Want to Miss a Thing
 Dexter Yates
 Molly Hayes

Release details 
 2013, UK, Headline Review, pub date 31 January 2013, hardback
 2013, UK, Headline Review, pub date 20 June 2013, paperback
 2013, UK, Headline Review, pub date 31 January 2013, E-book

References

2013 British novels
Romantic comedy novels
British romance novels
Contemporary romance novels
Headline Publishing Group books